Chained Girls is a 1965 film. It is an example of the exploitation film.

This "exposé" claims to reveal the shocking truth about lesbianism in today's society with supposed hidden camera footage. This was a way of getting around censorship, to include what was by the standards of the time fairly explicit material.  It includes some bizarre scenes, including what purports to be a lesbian initiation, with a woman gang-raped by a group of "dykes" led by a "bull dyke", and two "dykes" fighting each other (apparently to the death) over the same "femme" lesbian.  Some have detected an irony that the background music is by Tchaikovsky, who was gay.

It was produced by George Weiss (best known for Glen or Glenda), and written directed by Joseph P. Mawra.

It has been released on DVD along with Daughters of Lesbos.

See also
List of American films of 1965

References

External links 

review
another review

1965 films
American sexploitation films
American black-and-white films
Lesbian-related films
1965 LGBT-related films
1960s English-language films
1960s American films